Untitled is a painting by Ellen Gallagher. It is in the collection of the Art Institute of Chicago in Chicago, Illinois in the United States.

Keeping in the tradition of Gallagher's large-scale paintings, Untitled consists of black rubber which is texturized with paper on canvas. On the lower right of the painting, Gallagher used enamel and rubber to depict an African person, that she describes as a "fantasy." The viewer sees the back of the African person's head, with a mohawk hairstyle, tattoos and piercings. 

The painting was acquired by the Art Institute of Chicago in 2004.

See also
 Untitled, a 1999 painting, National Galleries of Scotland

References

1999 paintings
Paintings in the collection of the Art Institute of Chicago
Paintings by Ellen Gallagher
Black people in art